José Luis Mandros (born 12 November 1998) is a Peruvian long jumper. His personal best is 8.17 metres. 

He won the gold medal at the 2022 South American indoor championship in Cochabamba, Bolivia. 

He finished fifth at the 2016 South American Under-23 Championships, fourth at the 2017 South American Championships, won the gold medal at the 2017 South American U20 Championships and the gold medal at the 2018 Ibero-American Championships.

International competitions

References

1998 births
Living people
Peruvian male long jumpers
Athletes (track and field) at the 2019 Pan American Games
Pan American Games competitors for Peru
Ibero-American Championships in Athletics winners
21st-century Peruvian people